Brendan Murtagh (born 1983) is an Irish hurler. His league and championship career with the Westmeath senior team spanned twenty seasons from 2001 until 2020.

Born in Mullingar, County Westmeath, Murtagh was educated at Mullingar Community College and later at Sligo Institute of Technology. He first played competitive hurling at juvenile and underage levels with Clonkill, before later joining the senior team. The highlight of Murtagh's club career was the winning of an All-Ireland medal in the intermediate grade in 2008. He also won a Leinster medal and six senior county championship medals. As a Gaelic footballer, Murtagh won two senior county championship medals with the Downs club.

Murtagh made his debut on the inter-county scene at the age of fifteen when he was selected for the Westmeath minor team. He enjoyed a successful tenure in this grade, culminating with the winning of an All-Ireland medal in 1999. Murtagh subsequently joined the Westmeath under-21 team, winning All-Ireland medals in 2000 and 2003. By this stage he had also joined the Westmeath senior team, making his debut during the 2001 championship. Over the course of the next seventeen seasons, Murtagh won three Christy Ring Cup medals. He also won a National League Division 2 medal in 2008. Murtagh played his last game for Westmeath in November 2020.

After missing out on selection for the Leinster inter-provincial team through injury, Murtagh was included on the starting fifteen in 2009. He was a regular in several campaigns and won two Railway Cup medals.

He has been a Westmeath senior hurling selector.

Honours

Clonkill
All-Ireland Intermediate Club Hurling Championship (1): 2008
Leinster Intermediate Club Hurling Championship (1): 2007
Westmeath Senior Hurling Championship (6): 2001, 2007, 2009, 2011, 2012, 2015

The Downs
Westmeath Senior Football Championship (2): 2003, 2005

Westmeath
 Christy Ring Cup (3): 2005, 2007, 2010
 National Hurling League Division 2 (1): 2008
 Kehoe Cup (2): 2009, 2010
All-Ireland Under-21 B Hurling Championship (2): 2000, 2003
All-Ireland Minor B Hurling Championship (1): 1999

Leinster
Railway Cup (2): 2009, 2012

References

1983 births
Living people
Clonkill hurlers
Dual players
Hurling selectors
Westmeath inter-county hurlers
Westmeath inter-county Gaelic footballers
Leinster inter-provincial hurlers
Alumni of the Institute of Technology, Sligo